The Taiwan McDonald's bombings occurred on April 28 and 29, 1992. Bombs were planted in or near various McDonald's restaurant franchises in Taiwan. The bombings – part of an extortion attempt – caused the death of a policeman and injuries to four civilians, including two young children, and resulted in the temporary closure of the certain McDonald's locations in Taiwan.

Two people were subsequently convicted of involvement in the bombings, with the bomber themselves being sentenced to life imprisonment.

Bombings
The first bomb exploded at a restaurant in Taipei on the afternoon of April 28, 1992. A device had been located in the male toilets in the restaurant and the bomb squad were in attendance at the time. The bomb went off as it was either being removed from the restaurant or as an attempt was being made to defuse it in situ. The resulting explosion killed one bomb squad officer. Later that day another bomb exploded in a telephone booth outside a McDonald's in Kaohsiung in the south of the country. The devices were found to have been triggered by mercury tilt switches.

That evening, police found a soft-drink bottle in a Taipei parking lot containing an anonymous letter demanding $240,000 from McDonald's and stating that six bombs would be planted at McDonald's restaurants. Another device was found nearby.

On April 29, another bomb detonated in the Taipei suburb of Yonghe. The device had again been found in the men's room and detonated as it was being examined by the restaurant manager, leaving them in a critical condition and hospitalising another employee. Flying glass from the explosion also injured two children.

Response
On Wednesday 29 February, Taiwan McDonald's Corp announced the indefinite closure of 49 of its restaurants and offered a $480,000 reward for assistance in finding those responsible for the bombings. The firm also said that it was working closely with police to improve security at its restaurants after which they would reopen. A total reward of $880,000 was made available.

McDonald's began reopening its restaurants in Taiwan on 3 March. Initially only nine branches reopened. The reopened restaurants featured enhanced security measures including CCTV cameras, metal detectors and searches of patrons by security guards.

Convictions
On May 16, Chen Hsi-Hsieh, a plumber, and Pan Che-Ming were arrested and charged with murder and extortion by the local prosecutor, who demanded the death penalty for both.

Chen was convicted of murder and extortion and sentenced to life in prison by a Taipei District Court on 25 November 1992. His accomplice Pan was sentenced to 15 years and six months for providing the explosives and harboring Chen. The presiding judge explained that they had not used the death penalty as they did not believe that Chen and Pan really intended to kill, demonstrated by them leaving a note for police explaining how to defuse the devices.

See also
 Extortion

References

Explosions in 1992
Terrorist incidents in Asia in 1992
History of Taipei
Organized crime events in Taiwan
1992 crimes in Taiwan
Attacks on restaurants in Asia
Murder in Taiwan
April 1992 events in Asia
History of McDonald's
1990s murders in Taiwan
1992 murders in Asia
Terrorist incidents in Taiwan
Building bombings in Asia